Elfyn Rhys Evans (born 28 December 1988) is a Welsh rally driver. He is currently teamed with Scott Martin and is competing for Toyota Gazoo Racing in the World Rally Championship.

Career
The son of 1996 British Rally Championship Champion and former WRC driver Gwyndaf Evans, he is sponsored by the family Ford motor dealership in Dolgellau, first established by his great-grandfather in Dinas Mawddwy, renamed to Gwyndaf Evans Motors in 1983.

Evans began his professional career in 2007, driving a Group N production-car-class Ford Fiesta in the Ford Fiesta Sporting Trophy. He also competed in that year's Rally GB in Wales.

In 2010 Evans won the British Junior Rally championship and was the winner of the UK Ford Fiesta Trophy series, also he won the Pirelli Star Driver Shoot-out after two days of tests and assessments at the Sweet Lamb rally complex in his native Wales, with a prize of a fully funded season in a Pirelli-backed Group N Subaru Impreza run by the championship-winning TEG Sport team – a prize worth in excess of £200,000.

In 2012, Evans secured the FIA World Rally Championship (WRC) Academy title, the R2 title in the British Rally Championship (BRC) and the UK Fiesta Sport Trophy. In addition, he won the end-of-year FST International Shootout. In 2013 he contested a programme of WRC events in a 4WD car – his prize for winning the WRC Academy – and worked at M-Sport, helping to develop rally cars for the WRC and other championships.

His 2013 season began with the first round of the Australian Rally Championship, the National Rally in Canberra, in which he retired early on the first day. He then drove a Fiesta RRC on the WRC Rally of Portugal, retiring with a transmission problem before starting the final day under Rally 2 regulations. To his surprise, he was then asked to compete on the Rally Italy in Sardinia in a Ford Fiesta World Rally Car after Nasser Al-Attiyah was forced to withdraw because of commitments in Qatar. Despite having never competed on the event before, using Nasser's co-driver, competing in a WRC car for the first time and with no pre-event testing, Evans finished sixth.

Evans switched to M-Sport for the 2014 season to drive a Ford Fiesta WRC as the teammate of veteran Mikko Hirvonen. His best results have been fourth at Mexico and Germany. The driver scored two podiums in 2015, finishing 7th in the overall standings.

M-Sport dropped Evans to the WRC-2 in 2016. Driving a Ford Fiesta R5, he has scored wins at Monte Carlo, Sweden and Tour de Corse. Also with a Fiesta R5, he won the British Rally Championship with five wins in seven races.

For 2017, Elfyn rejoined the M-Sport World Rally Team to drive the DMACK car. He started the year with sixth in Monte Carlo, setting several fastest stage times, and then repeated the performance in Sweden. After two disappointing rounds in Mexico and Corsica, at round five in Argentina, Evans benefited from misfortune for his rivals to end day one with a minute's lead. On day two, Evans struggled with punctures, a spin and a damaged diffuser, and saw his lead fall to just 11 seconds. On the final stage, it was a straight battle between him and Hyundai driver Thierry Neuville. He pushed early in the stage, but lost several seconds when he hit a bridge. He tried hard to make up the lost time, but in the end he lost his first victory by just 0.7 seconds to Neuville. In Finland, Evans was left to uphold team honors after a crash for teammate Sébastien Ogier and a puncture for Ott Tänak. He dutifully set consistent top three stage times and snatched second place on the last stage from Juho Hänninen, in what many journalists described as the best drive of his career so far. At the penultimate round on his home rally in Wales, Evans took advantage of his DMACK tyres, which were widely suited to the conditions, to take his first WRC win, the first for a Welsh driver, and the first for a British driver on Wales Rally GB since the late Richard Burns in 2000. He would finish the championship in fifth place.

Evans would later repeat his success in Wales with a second victory in the 2020 Rally Sweden, where he led the rally despite adverse weather conditions which forced the organisers to abridge the event to just nine stages. This marked his first win in Sweden, his first rally win for Toyota, and the first British driver to win the event. His victory in Sweden also allowed him to lead the points standings in the WRC driver's championship for the first time in his career. He eventually finished the year in second position in the Covid-abbreviated championship, eight points behind champion Ogier, and nine points ahead of Tänak, who finished third.

During the 2021 World Rally Championship, his second season with Toyota, Evans won two further WRC events, in Portugal and Finland, and finished in second position in five others. He remained in contention for the title until the final rally of the season, but finished that event in second position to championship winner and Toyota teammate Ogier. For the second year in a row, Evans finished the championship in second position, 23 points behind Ogier and 31 points ahead of third-placed Neuville.

WRC victories

Results

WRC results
 
* Season still in progress.

WRC Academy results

WRC-2 results

ERC results

References

External links

 Gwyndaf Evans Motors

1988 births
Living people
People from Dolgellau
Sportspeople from Gwynedd
Welsh rally drivers
World Rally Championship drivers
Toyota Gazoo Racing drivers
M-Sport drivers